Alkalicoccus daliensis is a Gram-positive, facultatively anaerobic, alkaliphilic, spore-forming and motile bacterium from the genus of Alkalicoccus which has been isolated from the Dali Lake from the Inner Mongolia.

References

Bacillaceae
Bacteria described in 2012